Alberto Nardin (born 30 April 1990) is an Italian former racing cyclist, who competed professionally for UCI Professional Continental team  in 2015 and 2016. He began his professional cycling career in 2015 and made his debut at the Vuelta al Táchira.

Major results

2011
 8th Gran Premio San Giuseppe

References

External links

1990 births
Living people
Italian male cyclists
Place of birth missing (living people)
People from Bra, Piedmont
Sportspeople from the Province of Cuneo
Cyclists from Piedmont